Epischnia cretaciella is a species of moth in the  family Pyralidae. It is found in Croatia, North Macedonia, Greece, Turkey, Russia and Libya.

The wingspan is about 31 mm.

The larvae have been recorded feeding on Helichrysum italicum and Inula candida.

References

External links
lepiforum.de

Moths described in 1869
Phycitini
Moths of Europe
Moths of Asia